Donald Christian Dafoe is an American surgeon and research scientist.

Biography
The eldest son of a surgeon, Dafoe graduated from Appleton West High School in Appleton, Wisconsin, in 1967, where he was on the football and wrestling teams. He then attended the University of Wisconsin-Madison, where he received his undergraduate degree in zoology and his medical degree. 

He became a transplant surgeon after training in surgery at the Hospital of the University of Pennsylvania, and now works at University of California Irvine Medical Center in Orange, California, where he is chief of transplantation surgery. He previously worked at Cedars-Sinai Medical Center, where he was Director of the Pancreas Transplantation, Kidney and Pancreas Transplant Center; Director of Surgical Education; and held the Eris M. Field Endowed Chair in Diabetes Research. He was previously medical director for the California Transplant Donor Network. 

He has written over 160 peer-reviewed articles, and has been on the editorial board of Journal of Surgical Research, The Chimera, and Transplantation Science.

Ex-husband to vascular surgeon Dr. Rhoda Dafoe and Sahara Dafoe, he is a father of six, and is the brother of actor Willem Dafoe. He also has five sisters and another brother.

References

American transplant surgeons
Living people
Year of birth missing (living people)
Place of birth missing (living people)
People from Appleton, Wisconsin
Physicians from Wisconsin
University of California, Irvine faculty
 University of Wisconsin–Madison College of Letters and Science alumni
University of Wisconsin School of Medicine and Public Health alumni